The 1881 Penn State football team was an American football team that represented Pennsylvania State College—now known as Pennsylvania State University–during the 1881 college football season. It was the first football team fielded by the school. Penn State played only one game in 1881, beating Lewisburg by a score of 9–0.  Although this game was reported in two State College newspapers and The Mirror, the University at Lewisburg campus newspaper, Bucknell denies that this game ever happened. Penn State did not field teams from 1882 through 1886.

Schedule

References

Penn State
Penn State Nittany Lions football seasons
College football undefeated seasons
Penn State football